Tikhov is an eroded lunar impact crater on the Moon's far side. It is nearly attached to the east-southeastern outer rim of the larger crater Avogadro. About one crater diameter the east-northeast of Tikhov is the equally worn crater Emden, and to south-southeast lies the younger Tsinger.

This feature has been battered by subsequent impacts, leaving a series of smaller craters along the rim, inner wall, and floor of the crater. The most recent of these impacts are several small, cup-shaped craters along the eastern rim and inner wall and floor. As a result of this wear, the outer rim is rounded and uneven, although the circular nature of the rim can still be discerned.

See also 
 Asteroid 2251 Tikhov

References 

 
 
 
 
 
 
 
 
 
 
 
 

Impact craters on the Moon